88Glam (stylized in all caps) is the self-titled debut mixtape by Canadian hip hop duo 88Glam. It was originally self-released on November 7, 2017. The mixtape was features a sole guest appearance from Nav. It was re-released through XO Records and Republic Records, on April 20, 2018. It features an additional guest appearance from 2 Chainz. The production on the mixtape was handled by Murda Beatz, WondaGurl, Cubeatz, AlexOnWeed, Joseph L'étranger, and Villa Beatz, among others.

Background and release
On October 31, 2017, the duo hosted a listening party for friends and family in Toronto. In a statement with Billboard, the duo states,

On November 7, 2017, the music video for "Bali", which features Canadian rapper and fellow XO Records labelmate Nav, was released and directed by XO's co-founder and manager, Cash. On December 7, 2017, the music video for "Big Tymers," premiered on Paper. The mixtapes's first promotional single, "12" was released on November 1, 2017. The music video premiered on Billboard and was directed by Dan LeMoyne.

Critical reception

Scott Glaysher of Exclaim! wrote that the album is best enjoyed for what it is: "a satisfying, distorted trap-a-thon with plenty of hearty beats and boastful bravado."

Track listing

Personnel
All programming is credited to the producers of each track, except where noted.

Musicians
 AlexOnWeed – keyboards 
 Villa Beatz – keyboards 
 Joseph L'étranger – keyboards 
 Murda Beatz – keyboards , programming 
 WondaGurl – keyboards , programming 
 Cubeatz – keyboards , programming 
 Cahl Miller – keyboards 
 Yung Shrimp Tempura – keyboards 

Technical
 AlexOnWeed – recording , mixer 
 Yung Shrimp Tempura – recording assistant 
 Villa Beatz – recording assistant 

Additional personnel
 Mihailo Andic – art direction, photography
 Andrew Park – art direction

Charts

References

2017 mixtape albums
Debut mixtape albums
Republic Records albums
Albums produced by Murda Beatz
Albums produced by WondaGurl
Albums produced by Cubeatz